The Mega Duck WG-108 (also known as Cougar Boy) is a handheld game console that was developed and manufactured by Hong Kong-based Welback Holdings through its Timlex International division, and released in 1993.

It was marketed under various different brands worldwide including Creatronic and Videojet, and the shell of the console came in white or black plastic. It was sold for about fl 129 in the Netherlands, and for a similar price in France and Germany.

In South America (mainly in Brazil), the Chinese-made Creatronic version was distributed by Cougar USA, also known as "Cougar Electronic Organization", and sold as the "Cougar Boy". Cougar USA didn't release the Cougar Boy in its origin country.

The cartridges are very similar to those of the Watara Supervision, but slightly narrower with fewer contacts (36 pins, whereas Supervision cartridges have 40).  Conceptually, the electronics inside the Supervision and the Mega Duck are also very similar. The position of the volume controls, contrast controls, buttons, and connectors are virtually identical.  However, the LCD of the Supervision is larger than the Mega Duck's.

The Cougar Boy came with a 4-in-one game cartridge and a stereo earphone.

With an external joystick (not included) two players could play against each other simultaneously.

A variant in the form of an educational laptop for children was released in Germany by Hartung as the Mega Duck Super Junior Computer, and in Brazil as the Super QuiQue. An extra accessory called the Mega Duck Printer was also released for this variant.

Technical specifications

The Mega Duck features a multi board design, separating the motherboard, LCD, and controller PCB into three different assemblies. The battery compartment is found on the back casing, being the contacts connected by wires and soldered onto the main board.
 CPU : Sharp LR35902 (embedded in the main VLSI)
 Clockspeed : 4.194304 MHz
 RAM : 16 KB in two 8K chips (Goldstar GM76C88LFW)
 System logic : 80 pins VLSI chip
 LCD :  2.7" (48 (h) x 51 (w) mm) STN dot matrix. resolution 160×144 at 59.732155 Hz
 Grayscales : 4 levels of dark blue on a green background
 Player controls : 4 directional keys, A, B, Select and Start keys
 Other controls : On/off switch and contrast and volume regulators
 Sound : Built-in speaker (8Ω 200 mW) and stereo headset output
 Dimensions : 
 Weight : 249 g (w/o batteries)
 Power : Four AA batteries or AC adapter 6 VDC / 300 mA
 Current consumption : 700 mW
 Play duration : 15 hours on one set of four AA batteries
 Expansion Interface : Serial link for two player games (6 pins), or external joystick.
 Game medium : 36 pins ROM cartridge, 63 (l) x 54 (w) mm and 7 mm thick, 17 gram.

The Video Display Controller of the Mega Duck/Cougar Boy has one special feature, the display logic uses two "display planes" that are used to create parallax scrolling backgrounds, as if the picture is drawn on two sheets of which the top sheet is partly transparent.

List of games

This is an (incomplete) list of Mega Duck/Cougar Boy games. Each Mega Duck/Cougar Boy game is similarly labeled as the same games were marketed for both systems, although not all games were released for the Cougar Boy. The notation MDxxx is used for Mega Duck Games, and the notation CBxxx for a Cougar Boy Games. A MD002 is exactly the same game as the CB002, even to a point that some "Cougar Boy" games start up with a Mega Duck logo. Some notation numbers go unused, going up to 037, but missing 012 and 023 for example.

With the exception of the pack-in game for the Mega Duck (The Brick Wall) which was developed by the manufacturer, all games were developed by Thin Chen Enterprise under the "Sachen" and "Commin" brand names, and were  later re-released for the Game Boy in 4-in-1 and 8-in-1 cartridges without the licence from Nintendo.

Although 24 cartridges (not counting Cougar Boy variants or add-ons for the Super Junior Computer) are known to exist, another game is listed on various websites called Tip & Tap, however, it is not known if the game was ever released, or if it existed at all.

References 

Handheld game consoles
Fourth-generation video game consoles
Products introduced in 1993